Hinduism in Fiji has a following primarily among Indo-Fijians, the descendants of indentured workers brought to Fiji by the British as cheap labor for colonial sugarcane plantations. Hindus started arriving in Fiji starting in 1879 and continuing through 1920, when Britain abolished the slavery-like indenture system. Fiji identifies people as "Indo-Fijians" if they can trace their ancestry to the Indian subcontinent, Hindus form about 27.9% the population of Fiji.

History

Fiji became part of the British colonial empire in 1874. A few years later, in 1879, the British government brought the first Indians on coolie ships, as indentured laborers to work in the sugarcane plantations of Fiji owned by British colonial officials. By 1919, about 60,000 Indians had been brought to Fiji, with job advertisements and work contracts that promised Indians right to return or right to stay, own land and live freely in Fiji after the 5 year work contract period was over. These contracts were called grimit (phonetically derived from the English word "agreement").

Nearly 85% of Indian origin people brought to Fiji as indentured laborers were Hindus (others were Indian Muslims, Indian Christians and Indian Sikhs). The indentured laborers were poor, escaping famines and poverty during the British colonial rule of India, and brought to Fiji as part of a wave that saw human migration as cheap labor from India, China and southeast Asian countries to plantations and mining operations in the Pacific Islands, Africa, Caribbean and South American nations. About a fourth of the immigrants came from South India primarily Tamil Nadu, while the remaining 75% are from northern states primarily Uttar Pradesh, but also from Bihar, Jharkhand, Haryana and Punjab - each group bringing their own version of Hinduism.

Many indentured Hindu laborers in Fiji preferred to return to India after their indentured labor contract was over. Estimates suggest 40% had returned by 1940, with higher return rates in early years. In 1920, after non-violent civil protests led by Gandhi against indenture system in British colonies around the world, Britain abolished the system. This stopped the inflow of new Indian labor into Fiji plantations, while Indians continued to leave Fiji plantations. The departure of productive, low cost Indian labor became a serious labor shortage problem for the British plantations. In 1929, the British colonial government granted Indo-Fijian Hindus electoral and some civil rights, in most part to stabilize exports and profits from its Fijian sugar plantations and to prevent Indian laborers from leaving from the labor-intensive plantations. But the electoral rights granted were limited, not proportional but racial quota based, and the government segregated Indo-Fijians in a manner similar to South Africa, that is on communal and racial basis from Europeans and native Fijians. This system was resisted by the Hindus, and in an act of peaceful protest, Hindus refused to accept the segregated council. However, within years, the Hindu community split along the lines of majority Sanatan Dharma group and a minority Arya Samaj group, a situation that delayed further development of Indo-Fijian political rights. A colleague of Gandhi, A. D. Patel led independence initiative in Fiji, demanding civil rights for all Fijians. However, the political segregation and unequal human rights for Hindus (and other Indo-Fijians) was retained in Fiji's first Constitution as the British empire granted independence to its colony Fiji in 1970.

According to 1976 Census of Fiji, 295,000 people (or 50 percent of Fiji's population) were of Indo-Fijian origins, of which 80% were Hindus. In other words, 40 percent of Fiji's population were Hindus. After a period of persistent persecution from 1980s and several coups, which included burning of Hindu homes, arson of temples and rape, Fiji witnessed a wave of emigration of Hindus and other Indo-Fijians to Australia, New Zealand, United Kingdom, Canada and India. About 50,000 of them emigrated after the 1987 coups, between 1987 and 1992 alone. The percentage population of Hindus in Fiji has declined since then, both in total and in percentage terms.

Demographics

In the 1976 census of Fiji, 45% of its population professed to be Hindus. From late 1980s through early 2000s, Fiji witnessed several coups and considerable communal unrest, where some Hindus faced persecution. Many Hindus in Fiji emigrated to other countries. 

The 1996 census recorded 261,097 Hindus (33.7% of the total population). However, the 2007 census recorded 233,393 (27.9%) which had a -5.8% decrease. The Hindu community in Fiji has built many  temples, schools and community centers over time. The community celebrates Diwali as their primary annual festival.
According to the 1996 census most of the Hindus in Fiji are Indo-Fijians and only 864 indigenous Fijian following Hinduism.

The Hindu population in Fiji is not uniformly distributed. Population in some villages and towns such as Nadi and Nausori area have a Hindu majority.

Society
The social structure among Fijian Hindus has lacked any caste structure. Scholars suggest that this lack of formation or observance of caste system among Fijian Hindus may have been because of the nature of work in Fijian plantations where everyone's profession revolved around farming, because Fijian Hindus lived together from the time they arrived in coolie ships, and because of demographic constraints faced by them. Extensive exogamy has been observed among Hindus of Fiji since the earliest days of plantation settlements, just like in other major indentured Hindu labor settlements in Mauritius, Natal (South Africa) and the Caribbean.

As with South Africa, the British colonial officials segregated people by race in Fiji. Plantation settlements in Fiji, as a policy, considered Indo-Fijian Hindus as a worker class, and did not allow them to live near or with European settlers, nor mix with native Fijian people. The segregation created a culture contact problem, that worsened over time. During the time of colonial rule, all the indigenous Fijians were proselytised and converted en masse to Christianity (mostly Methodism) by missionaries from Europe, mainly the British Isles. The Indo-Fijian Hindus, however, largely refused to convert and the great majority have remained Hindus to this very day.

Culture

Fijian Hindus celebrate Rama Navami, Holi and Diwali. Of these, Diwali is a public holiday in Fiji.

In the first half of 20th century, Holi was the principal festival for Hindus of Fiji. Thereafter, Diwali gained prominence. After Fiji gained independence from British rule, Diwali has eclipsed all other Hindu festivals, and is now the principal Fijian Hindu festival. John Kelly suggests that this may reflect socio-political situation in Fiji, the segregation faced by Hindus as they demanded equal political rights with European residents and native Fijian people. This shift in cultural milieu among Hindus in Fiji, posits Kelly, may be because Holi is a transcendence-oriented, all inclusive, extrospective festival, while Diwali is a perfection-oriented devotionalism and introspective festival.

Among the Hindus of Fiji, any kind of work including physical labor in farms, is culturally considered a form of puja (prayer) and religious offering.

Hindus began building temples after their arrival in Fiji. These served as venues for marriages, annual religious festivals, family prayers after the death of loved ones, and other social events. The Hindu temples were constructed both in northern and southern Indian styles. The Shiu Hindu temple at Nadawar in Nadi, for example, was built in 1910; however this temple was destroyed in an arson attack and communal violence against Hindus in 2008. Sri Siva Subramaniya Hindu Temple in Nadi is the largest Hindu temple in Fiji.

In addition to temples, Hindus built schools and community centers to improve the social and educational opportunities. For example, Kuppuswami Naidu, a devotee of Swami Vivekananda and who later was known as Sadhu Swami, visited various islands of Fiji and met diverse Hindu communities particularly from South India, to start the TISI Sangam initiative. This community effort over time created schools, nursing clinics, community assistance in farm technologies, temples and a community center/history museum for Hindu people in Fiji.

World War II
Indo-Fijians were called upon to join the cause of allied forces during World War II. Over 5,000 Hindus in Fiji served with millions of soldiers from Australia, New Zealand, India and other British colonies during the war. Indo-Fijians served in Asia and Europe during the World War II.

Persecution
By the time Fiji gained independence from the British colonial empire, Hindus and other Indo-Fijians constituted nearly fifty-percent of the total Fijian population. Nevertheless, the colonial era laws and the first constitution for Fiji, granted special rights to native Fijians. These laws relegated Hindus as unequal citizens of Fiji with unequal human rights. For example, it denied them property rights, such as the ability to buy or own land. Hindus and other Indo-Fijians have since then not enjoyed equal human rights as other Fijians. They can only work as tenant farmers for Fijian landlords. The difference in human rights has been a continuing source of conflict between "native" Fijians and Indo-Fijians, with native Fijians believing Fiji to be their ancestral land that only they can own, and Indo-Fijians demanding equal rights for all human beings.

Beyond land ownership, Hindus have been persecuted in the Fijian communal structure. Spike Boydell states, "the British introduced the divisive and unworkable system of communal representation and communal electoral rolls. Thus, different communities were represented by their own kind. This still extends to schooling in a prevailing quasi apartheid educational system."

During the late 1990s, Fiji witnessed a series of riots by radical native Fijians against Hindus (and other Indo-Fijians). In the spring of 2000, the democratically elected Fijian government led by Prime Minister Mahendra Chaudhry was held hostage by a group headed by George Speight. They demanded a segregated state exclusively for the native Fijians, thereby legally abolishing any human rights the Hindu inhabitants have. Hindu owned shops, Hindu schools and temples were destroyed, vandalized and looted.

The Methodist Church of Fiji and Rotuma, and particularly Sitiveni Rabuka who led the 1987 coup in Fiji, called for the creation of a Christian State and endorsed forceful conversion of Hindus after a coup d'état in 1987. In 2012, Fiji Methodist Church's president, Tuikilakila Waqairatu, called for Fiji to officially declare Christianity as the state religion; the Hindu community leaders demanded that Fiji be a secular state where religion and state are separate.

See also
 Fiji
 Religion in Fiji
 Demographics of Fiji
 Indo-Fijians

References

External links
 South Indians in Fiji - history, development and Then India Sanmarga Ikya (TISI) Sangam
 Kevin Miller, Chapter 4 - The Development of Hinduism in Fiji's Colonial Period
 Fiji Temples Torched, December 1989